Boe is a surname. Notable people with the surname include:

Alfie Boe (born 1973), English tenor
Alisha Boe (born 1997), Norwegian actress
Archie R. Boe (1921–1989), former president of Sears, Roebuck and Co. and Allstate Insurance Co.
Christoffer Boe (born 1974), Danish film director and screenwriter
David Boe (born 1936), American organist and pedagogue
Eric Boe (born 1964), United States Air Force fighter pilot Colonel, test pilot and a NASA astronaut
Jason Boe (1929–1990), American optometrist from Oregon
John Boe (born 1955), New Zealand former rugby union footballer and a current coach
Mathias Boe (born 1980), Danish badminton player
Morten Boe (born 1971), Norwegian athlete who competes in compound archery
Nils Boe (1913–1992), American politician who served as the 23rd Governor of South Dakota from 1965 to 1969
Randall Boe (born 1962), was General Counsel for AOL
Roy Boe (1929–2009), owner of the New Jersey Nets, New York Islanders, and several other professional sports teams
Tracy Boe, North Dakota Democratic-NPL Party member of the North Dakota House of Representatives

References